Apisak Tantivorawong (born 28 August 1953) is a Thai banker and financial executive. He served as Minister of Finance in the first cabinet of Prime Minister Prayut Chan-o-cha from 2015 to 2019.

References 

Apisak Tantivorawong
Apisak Tantivorawong
Apisak Tantivorawong
Place of birth missing (living people)
Living people
1953 births
Apisak Tantivorawong